Valsa sordida is a species of fungus within the family Valsaceae. A plant pathogen, it causes dieback of small branches and twigs of broad-leaved trees, usually poplar. It is found in Africa, Australasia, Europe, and North and South America. The anamorph is Cytospora chrysopserma.

References 

Sordariomycetes
Fungi described in 1870
Fungi of Africa
Fungi of Europe
Fungi of Australia
Fungi of North America
Fungi of South America
Fungal tree pathogens and diseases
Diaporthales
Taxa named by Theodor Rudolph Joseph Nitschke